Molecular Omics is a bimonthly peer-reviewed scientific journal published by the Royal Society of Chemistry. It covers the interface between chemistry, the "omic" sciences, and systems biology. The editor-in-chief is Robert L. Moritz (Institute for Systems Biology).

Abstracting and indexing 
The journal is abstracted and indexed in MEDLINE and the Science Citation Index.

References

External links 
 

Biochemistry journals
Publications established in 2005
Royal Society of Chemistry academic journals
English-language journals
Bimonthly journals